Adarsha or Adarshya may refer to:

Adarsha Vidya Mandir, one of the largest secondary schools in Lalitpur, Nepal
Adarsha Vidyalay Chikhli, one of the most renowned educational institutes in Buldana district as well as in Maharashtra
Adarsha Vidyalaya, school in Sahakar Nagar, Shell Colony, Chembur, Mumbai, India
Mahendra Adarsha, town and Village Development Committee in Bara District in the Narayani Zone of south-eastern Nepal
Paropakar Adarsha Uccha Madhyamik Vidhalaya, school, Gorkha District, Nepal
Matuail Adarsha High School, school in Matuail, Bangladesh
Patiya Adarsha High School, one of the oldest schools of Bangladesh

See also
Adarsh, a given name and surname